Victorious (stylized as VICTORiOUS) is an American sitcom created by Dan Schneider that originally aired on Nickelodeon, debuting on March 27, 2010, and concluding on February 2, 2013 after four seasons. The series revolves around aspiring singer Tori Vega (portrayed by Victoria Justice), a teenager who attends a performing arts high school called Hollywood Arts High School, after taking her older sister Trina's (Daniella Monet) place in a showcase while getting into screwball situations on a daily basis. On her first day at Hollywood Arts, she meets Andre Harris (Leon Thomas III), Robbie Shapiro (Matt Bennett), Rex Powers (Robbie's puppet), Jade West (Elizabeth Gillies), Cat Valentine (Ariana Grande), and Beck Oliver (Avan Jogia). The series premiered after the 2010 Kids' Choice Awards. The series won Favorite TV Show award at the 2012 Kids' Choice Awards and 2013 Kids' Choice Awards, beating out iCarly. Victorious earned four Emmy nominations.

On August 10, 2012, Justice stated that the series would not be renewed. After the spin-off series Sam & Cat was announced, fans of Victorious expressed dismay that its spin-off series was the reason for its ending, but Schneider himself stated otherwise. Although the Victorious cast only filmed three seasons, when the decision to end the series was made, Nickelodeon split the third season in half, making a fourth season.

Plot
The series follows Tori Vega, a teenage girl who is accepted into Hollywood Arts, a fictional elite performing arts high school for talented teens. Other students at Hollywood Arts (and the students who later make up Tori's group of friends) include the musical prodigy Andre Harris, the socially awkward Robbie Shapiro and his ventriloquist dummy Rex, the sweet but dim-witted red-head Cat Valentine, the sarcastic and mean Jade West (who serves as Tori's frenemy), Jade's handsome down-to-earth, actor boyfriend Beck Oliver, and Tori's very untalented and self-absorbed older sister Trina. Other characters include Erwin Sikowitz, the performing-arts teacher for Hollywood Arts; Lane Alexander, the school's guidance counselor; and Sinjin Van Cleef, an odd and often unsettling classmate that handles audiovisual.

Cast

Main
 Victoria Justice as Tori Vega
 Leon Thomas III as Andre Harris
 Matt Bennett as Robbie Shapiro
 Elizabeth Gillies as Jade West
 Ariana Grande as Cat Valentine
 Avan Jogia as Beck Oliver
 Daniella Monet as Trina Vega

Recurring
 Eric Lange as Erwin Sikowitz
 Lane Napper as Lane Alexander
 Michael Eric Reid as Sinjin Van Cleef
 Jim Pirri as David Vega
 Jennifer Carta as Holly Vega
 Marilyn Harris as Andre's grandmother
 Susan Chuang as Mrs. Lee
 Darsan Solomon as Burf
 Jake Farrow as Rex (voice, uncredited)

Episodes

Special episodes

Production
Victorious is the fifth series created by Dan Schneider for Nickelodeon, after The Amanda Show, Drake & Josh, Zoey 101, and iCarly. Schneider first met Victoria Justice in 2005, when she was twelve and arrived to audition for the part of Lola Martinez on Zoey 101. Impressed by her energy and look, Schneider hired her and, after working with her on three episodes, called Nickelodeon to say, "I've got your next star." Justice continued her role on Zoey 101 until the series ended in 2008. In the meantime, Disney Channel, Nickelodeon's main competitor, had experienced immense success with franchises like Hannah Montana and High School Musical, which featured original songs and generated revenue through music as well as television. Seeking to "follow where the kids are", Nickelodeon executives asked Schneider to create a music-based show for the channel. Near the end of Zoey 101s run, Justice was summoned to meet with Schneider about a potential series starring her. Victorious is the first series on Nickelodeon to premiere in the 2010s decade. Big Time Rushs first episode premiered two months earlier, but its original pilot premiered in 2009.

While discussing possible concepts for the series during the meeting, Justice mentioned that she had attended a performing arts middle school. The idea intrigued Schneider, who recognized the appeal of a series concerning fame. "If there is anything I've learned about kids today—and I'm not saying this is good or bad—it's that they all want to be stars," said Schneider. Marjorie Cohn, who was then Nickelodeon's executive vice president of original programming and development, agreed. "Every kid thinks they're five minutes away and one lucky circumstance from being famous", Cohn stated. She noted that Schneider's iCarly, a sitcom about a girl who hosts a popular web show, was spurred by the rise of YouTube celebrities and has become a successful series for Nickelodeon.

On August 13, 2008, Nickelodeon announced that Justice had signed "an overall talent and music deal" with the company, agreeing to star in a then-untitled musical-comedy series about a girl who attends a performing arts high school. While discussing the show's premise, Schneider stated that while it would be nice if more children "wanted to be teachers and social workers" instead of celebrities, "At least in Victorious, you see a world where they're all working on the talent part." Nickelodeon Productions and the Columbia/Epic Label Group of Sony Music Entertainment agreed to co-produce the series as part of a partnership to develop talent and release their music.

Jerry Trainor, Perez Hilton, Josh Peck, Kesha, Nathan Kress, Drake Bell, Miranda Sings, and Jennette McCurdy have appeared on the series in cameos or as guest stars.

Season 1 of Victorious began filming on October 5, 2009, and ended on April 14, 2010, with 20 episodes produced. Season 2 began filming October 4, 2010, and finished filming on February 23, 2011. In August 2011, Victoria Justice confirmed that she was returning to the Victorious set, as Season 3 began filming on October 3, 2011. During the TV special 7 Secrets with Victoria Justice, Justice explained the weekly schedule the cast and crew operate on: scripts are issued to them on Sunday nights, the cast has table reads on Mondays and Tuesdays, then the episode is shot on Wednesday, Thursday and Friday and on Saturday, they watch a premiering of their show that is newly released to the public then.

Victoria Justice told M Magazine in August 2012 that "We will not be expecting a fourth season, this is the first time I've talked about it. I just found out a couple of days ago that we're not coming back. It's sad because I've been with Nickelodeon since I was 12 years old and I became a family with my Victorious cast. We spent a lot of time together and bonded for sure – I'll look back on the experience very fondly. It's a little shocking and a little bittersweet, but at the end of the day it might not be such a bad thing – we all want to do our own thing and continue to grow." The third season was split into two, thus making four seasons in total.

The series ended without a proper finale, a fact referenced in an episode of the series' spin-off, Sam & Cat, when the title characters' favorite show is cancelled and Cat asks, "What kind of network cancels a show without giving it a proper finale?"

Casting
Several of the actors on Victorious had either appeared in other Nickelodeon programs or Broadway musicals prior to Victorious premiere. In addition to Zoey 101, Victoria Justice appeared on iCarly in "iFight Shelby Marx" as Shelby Marx, as well as True Jackson, VP, The Naked Brothers Band, and The Troop. She also co-starred with Avan Jogia, who portrays Beck, in the Nickelodeon television film Spectacular!. Daniella Monet has guest starred as Rebecca Martin in three episodes of Zoey 101, Tootie in the Nickelodeon television film A Fairly Odd Movie: Grow Up, Timmy Turner!, the Supah Ninjas Season 1 episode "Morningstar Academy" as one of the main antagonists named Clarissa, and in Fred 2: Night of the Living Fred (in lieu of Jennette McCurdy) as Bertha. Leon Thomas III had not only guest starred in an episode of iCarly as Harper and also in The Naked Brothers Band but he had also previously appeared in musicals such as The Lion King, The Color Purple, and Caroline, or Change, and in the film August Rush. Elizabeth Gillies and Ariana Grande had co-starred in the musical 13.

Sets
Victorious was filmed at Nickelodeon on Sunset on Sunset Boulevard in Hollywood. According to Paula Kaplan, Nickelodeon's executive Vice President for talent, "In our adult world, nobody accommodates us for down time. But in a child's life on a set, we do take that seriously. At our studios on Sunset Boulevard, where we shoot iCarly and Victorious, the greenrooms are filled with games and Rock Band. We create an environment where they can have fun with their colleagues and take it easy."

Victorious is set primarily at Hollywood Arts, however the front of Hollywood Arts High School are digitally altered photos of Burbank High School. The lunch area of Hollywood Arts depicts the back area of Nickelodeon on Sunset, with a parking lot next to the back area. According to David Hinkley of the New York Daily News, "Outside of school, Victorious has the same look as iCarly, with most of the action taking place on one main set with a few basic home/crib-furniture items." The series also has a BLIX machine from Zoey 101.

Reception

Critical reception
Like iCarly, Victorious received generally mixed reviews. Variety magazine reviewer Brian Lowry wrote, "Victorious has been cobbled together with the wooden-headed market in mind." David Hinkley of the New York Daily News says the series' format is nearly identical to iCarlys and hopes that the series will develop a "more distinctive personality" over the course of the season. Roger Catlin of the Hartford Courant describes Victorious as "harmless but hardly entertaining". Mark A. Perigard of the Boston Herald titled his review "Victorious is a big loser" and writes, "The bulk of the cast mugs for the cameras, probably to compensate for a script that could have been commissioned from fifth-graders." Linda Stasi of the New York Post was mixed; she agreed that the series contained over-acting performers, "corny" dialogue and a "terribly, terribly loud laugh track", but believed it was "a surefire tween hit".

However, reviewers were positive about Justice's performance and suggested that the show's potential hinged on her. Hinkley comments, "At this point, Justice is better at singing than acting, and the show doesn't flow as smoothly as iCarly, but Justice has the personality and talent needed for a shot at being 'the Next Big Teen Thing'". Perigard describes her as "undeniably appealing" and Lowry states, "Justice is winsome and talented enough to provide the latest show a leg up in connecting with tween girls." Emily Ashby of Common Sense Media gave the series four out of five stars, writing, "Upbeat iCarly-like tween comedy promotes confidence".

Viewership

The series' premiere did well among viewers. The first episode, advertised as a "sneak preview" of the series, aired after the 2010 Kids' Choice Awards on March 27, 2010, to 5.7 million viewers, the second-highest premiering live-action Nickelodeon series to date. Its second episode was advertised as the series' official premiere and drew 3.48 million viewers. By comparison, Nickelodeon's Big Time Rush received 3.5 million viewers for its "sneak preview" debut in November 2009, and 7.1 million total viewers for its "premiere" in January 2010.

On April 2, 2011, the Season 2 premiere episode "Beggin' on Your Knees" became the most-watched episode of the series to date, with 6.1 million total viewers.

Merchandise
In fall 2011, Spin Master released dolls and toys based on the show. In June 2011, Walmart announced an exclusive-to-Walmart product line for the show; including over 250 products, such as apparel, accessories, lunch boxes, T-shirts, soundtrack CDs, DVDs, etc. It has sold its newest toy, Singing Tori, a doll of Tori singing. In 2012 dolls of Cat, Trina, and Jade were released. In late April 2012, McDonald's released Victorious toys, included in their Happy Meals. They relaunched in Australia in January/February 2013.

Video games
On November 15, 2011, Victorious: Time to Shine for Xbox 360 Kinect and Hollywood Arts Debut for Nintendo DS were released. On November 13, 2012, Victorious: Taking the Lead for Wii and Nintendo DS was released.

Awards and nominations

Music

Soundtracks
 Victorious: Music from the Hit TV Show (2011)
 Victorious 2.0: More Music from the Hit TV Show (2012)
 Victorious 3.0: Even More Music from the Hit TV Show (2012)

"Make It Shine" is the theme song of the series. The song also serves as the lead single from the soundtrack to the series. Victorious features approximately one song every three episodes.  The Victorious soundtrack, featuring 12 songs from the show (including "Leave It All to Shine") was released on August 2, 2011. The first 1,000 pre-orders received a CD booklet autographed by Justice, the special pre-order package (ordered before July 19, 2011) also included an exclusive customized Victorious poster.

On June 5, 2012, Columbia Records and Nickelodeon released Victorious 2.0: More Music from the Hit TV Show. The third soundtrack from the series, entitled Victorious 3.0: Even More Music from the Hit TV Show, was released on November 6, 2012.

Home media

Broadcast
Victorious has aired worldwide on Nickelodeon.

Season 1
Season 1 premiered on April 5, 2010, in Canada, on September 3, 2010, in the United Kingdom and Ireland, on September 14, 2010, in Australia and New Zealand, on October 1, 2010, in Southeast Asia, on March 27, 2011, in Pakistan and on January 23, 2013, in India.

Season 2
Season 2 premiered on October 7, 2011, in Canada, on October 17, 2011, in the UK and Ireland, on October 31, 2011, in Southeast Asia, in December 2011 in Australia and New Zealand, and on March 25, 2013, in India.

Season 3
Season 3 premiered in February 2012 in Canada, on September 7, 2012, in Southeast Asia, on September 15, 2012, in Australia and New Zealand, and on September 22, 2012, in the UK and Ireland.

Season 4
Season 4 premiered on February 8, 2013, in Southeast Asia, on February 11, 2013, in the UK and Ireland, and on March 8, 2013, in Australia and New Zealand.

Spin-off

A pilot was ordered for a series titled Sam & Cat. This series is a spin-off of both iCarly and Victorious, starring Ariana Grande as her character Cat Valentine from Victorious and Jennette McCurdy as Sam Puckett from iCarly. The series is about these two girls as they buddy up as roommates and start a babysitting business to fund their adventures. The 20-episode order was doubled to 40 episodes on July 11, 2013. However, by April 2014, the series was on hiatus due to behind-the-scenes issues with the cast and network.  After months of speculation, Sam & Cat was officially canceled on July 13, 2014.

References

External links
 
 Victorious at Nick.com
 

 
2010 American television series debuts
2013 American television series endings
2010s American high school television series
2010s American teen sitcoms
2010s Nickelodeon original programming
American children's television sitcoms
American musical television series
American television shows featuring puppetry
English-language television shows
Sony Music
Television series about actors
Television series about teenagers
Television series about fictional musicians
Television series by Schneider's Bakery
Television series created by Dan Schneider
Television shows set in Los Angeles
Works about performing arts education